The Kōhaihai River is a river of the northwest of New Zealand's South Island. Flowing southwest and then west from the Dommett Range, the river's entire length is within the Kahurangi National Park. The river's mouth marks the south western end of the Heaphy Track and the northern terminus of the West Coast's road system. The nearest town is Karamea.

See also
List of rivers of New Zealand

References

Rivers of the West Coast, New Zealand
Kahurangi National Park
Rivers of New Zealand